The 2021 WNBA season was the 23rd season for the Connecticut Sun franchise of the Women's National Basketball Association. It was also the 19th season for the franchise in Connecticut. The season began on May 14, 2021, at the Atlanta Dream.

The Sun started the season strongly and went on a five-game winning streak before losing their first game.  They lost two of their last three games in May to finish with a strong 6–2 record in that month.  The month of June was streaky for the Sun, with a three-game losing streak book-ended by a two-game winning streak and a three-game winning streak.  Those streaks left the team with a 5–3 record in June.  The Sun went 3–1 in July, the last month before the Olympic break.  The team headed into the Olympic break with a 14–6 overall record.

The first game back from the Olympic break was the inaugural WNBA Commissioner's Cup, where the Sun faced off against the Seattle Storm in Phoenix.  The game was difficult for the Sun and they lost 57–79.  However, this result would not portend the rest of the team's results after the Olympic break.  The Sun won their remaining seven games in August to finish the month with a 7–0 regular season record.  Their dominance continued into September where the Sun went 5–0, to finish the season on a thirteen-game winning streak.  Their final regular season record was 26–6, which earned them the top seed in the 2021 WNBA Playoffs.  Their 26 wins was tied for the most regular season wins in franchise history with 2005 and 2006.

As the first seed in the playoffs, the Sun earned a double bye into the Semifinals and would have home-court advantage against the lowest remaining seed from the Second Round.  After the Second Round, it was determined that the Sun would play the Chicago Sky.  The series started off with a thrilling double overtime game that the Sun dropped 95–101.  The Sun won the next game 79–68 to take a 1–1 series into Chicago.  Chicago used their home court to their advantage and won the next two games and the series 3–1.

WNBA Draft

Trades/Roster Changes

Current roster

Game log

Preseason

|-
| 1
| May 3
| New York
| colspan=4 | Scrimmage
| Mohegan Sun Arena0
| 0–0
|- style="background:#cfc;"
| 2
| May 8
| @ Dallas
| W 89–76
| Brionna Jones (22)
| Brionna Jones (9)
| Aleah Goodman (5)
| College Park Center
| 1–0

Regular season

|- style="background:#bbffbb;"
| 1
| May 14
| @ Atlanta
| W 78–67
| Jonquel Jones (26)
| J. JonesHiedeman (8)
| DeWanna Bonner (5)
| Gateway Center Arena561
| 1–0
|- style="background:#bbffbb;"
| 2
| May 16
| Phoenix
| W 86–78
| DeWanna Bonner (27)
| Jonquel Jones (13)
| Briann January (6)
| Mohegan Sun Arena2,042
| 2–0
|- style="background:#bbffbb;"
| 3
| May 19
| Indiana
| W 88–67
| Natisha Hiedeman (19)
| Jonquel Jones (11)
| Natisha Hiedeman (6)
| Mohegan Sun Arena2,084
| 3–0
|- style="background:#bbffbb;"
| 4
| May 21
| @ Phoenix
| W 84–67
| Jonquel Jones (16)
| Jonquel Jones (11)
| DeWanna Bonner (5)
| Phoenix Suns Arena4,101
| 4–0
|- style="background:#bbffbb;"
| 5
| May 23
| @ Las Vegas
| W 72–65
| DeWanna Bonner (22)
| Jonquel Jones (11)
| Jasmine Thomas (5)
| Michelob Ultra Arena1,954
| 5–0
|- style="background:#fcc;"
| 6
| May 25
| @ Seattle
| L 87–90 (OT)
| Jonquel Jones (28)
| Jonquel Jones (13)
| Jasmine Thomas (6)
| Angel of the Winds Arena1,011
| 5–1
|- style="background:#bbffbb;"
| 7
| May 28
| Washington
| W 86–81
| Jonquel Jones (20)
| Jonquel Jones (12)
| Jonquel Jones (5)
| Mohegan Sun Arena2,102
| 6–1
|- style="background:#fcc;"
| 8
| May 30
| @ Minnesota
| L 74–79 (OT)
| Jonquel Jones (22)
| BonnerB. Jones (6)
| BonnerJ. Thomas (5)
| Target Center2,007
| 6–2

|- style="background:#bbffbb;"
| 9
| June 1
| Las Vegas
| W 74–67
| Jonquel Jones (23)
| BonnerB. Jones (8)
| Jasmine Thomas (6)
| Mohegan Sun ArenaN/A
| 7–2
|- style="background:#bbffbb;"
| 10
| June 5
| New York
| W 85–64
| Jonquel Jones (31)
| Jonquel Jones (13)
| Jasmine Thomas (9)
| Mohegan Sun Arena2,118
| 8–2
|- style="background:#fcc;"
| 11
| June 13
| Seattle
| L 66–89
| BonnerCharles (14)
| DiJonai Carrington (7)
| Briann January (4)
| Mohegan Sun Arena2,248
| 8–3
|- style="background:#fcc;"
| 12
| June 17
| @ Chicago
| L 75–81
| Jasmine Thomas (20)
| Brionna Jones (12)
| Jasmine Thomas (4)
| Wintrust Arena1,293
| 8–4
|- style="background:#fcc;"
| 13
| June 19
| @ Chicago
| L 81–91
| Brionna Jones (22)
| B. JonesBonner (8)
| BonnerJanuary (6)
| Wintrust Arena1,293
| 8–5
|- style="background:#bbffbb;"
| 14
| June 22
| Dallas
| W 80–70
| Brionna Jones (26)
| DeWanna Bonner (13)
| DeWanna Bonner (6)
| Mohegan Sun Arena2,076
| 9–5
|- style="background:#bbffbb;"
| 15
| June 27
| Chicago
| W 74–58
| DeWanna Bonner (23)
| Beatrice Mompremier (11)
| JanuaryJ. Thomas (3)
| Mohegan Sun Arena2,014
| 10–5
|- style="background:#bbffbb;"
| 16
| June 29
| @ Washington
| W 90–71
| Jonquel Jones (23)
| Jonquel Jones (16)
| DeWanna Bonner (7)
| Entertainment and Sports Arena2,100
| 11–5

|- style="background:#bbffbb;"
| 17
| July 1
| @ Indiana
| W 86–80
| Brionna Jones (34)
| BonnerB. Jones (7)
| Jasmine Thomas (7)
| Bankers Life FieldhouseNo Fans
| 12–5
|- style="background:#fcc;"
| 18
| July 3
| @ Indiana
| L 67–73
| Jonquel Jones (16)
| Jonquel Jones (9)
| BonnerCharles (4)
| Bankers Life FieldhouseNo Fans
| 12–6
|- style="background:#bbffbb;"
| 19
| July 9
| Atlanta
| W 84–72
| Jonquel Jones (24)
| Jonquel Jones (16)
| Hiedeman (5)
| Mohegan Sun Arena2,286
| 13–6
|- style="background:#bbffbb;"
| 20
| July 11
| @ New York
| W 71–54
| Jonquel Jones (17)
| Jonquel Jones (17)
| Jonquel Jones (5)
| Barclays Center1,988
| 14–6

|-style="background:#fcc;"
| CC
| August 12
| vs. Seattle
| L 57–79
| BonnerHiedeman (11)
| Jonquel Jones (11)
| Jasmine Thomas (3)
| Footprint Center5,006
| N/A
|- style="background:#bbffbb;"
| 21
| August 15
| @ Dallas
| W 80–59
| Jonquel Jones (19)
| Jonquel Jones (15)
| Briann January (5)
| College Park Center2,399
| 15–6
|- style="background:#bbffbb;"
| 22
| August 17
| Minnesota
| W 72–60
| Jasmine Thomas (19)
| Jonquel Jones (13)
| Jasmine Thomas (5)
| Mohegan Sun Arena3,488
| 16–6
|- style="background:#bbffbb;"
| 23
| August 19
| Minnesota
| W 82–71
| DeWanna Bonner (31)
| DeWanna Bonner (11)
| Jasmine Thomas (7)
| Mohegan Sun Arena3,536
| 17–6
|- style="background:#bbffbb;"
| 24
| August 24
| Las Vegas
| W 76–62
| Briann January (19)
| Jonquel Jones (10)
| Jasmine Thomas (6)
| Mohegan Sun Arena4,012
| 18–6
|- style="background:#bbffbb;"
| 25
| August 26
| Los Angeles
| W 76–72
| Brionna Jones (23)
| Jonquel Jones (11)
| Jasmine Thomas (6)
| Mohegan Sun Arena3,702
| 19–6
|- style="background:#bbffbb;"
| 26
| August 28
| Los Angeles
| W 76–61
| Brionna Jones (16)
| Brionna Jones (15)
| Jasmine Thomas (5)
| Mohegan Sun Arena4,434
| 20–6
|- style="background:#bbffbb;"
| 27
| August 31
| @ Washington
| W 85–75
| Jonquel Jones (31)
| Jonquel Jones (14)
| Jasmine Thomas (6)
| Entertainment and Sports Arena2,269
| 21–6

|- style="background:#bbffbb;"
| 28
| September 7
| @ Dallas
| W 83–56
| Brionna Jones (18)
| Brionna Jones (10)
| Jasmine Thomas (6)
| College Park Center1,945
| 22–6
|- style="background:#bbffbb;"
| 29
| September 9
| @ Los Angeles
| W 75–57
| Jonquel Jones (21)
| Jonquel Jones (14)
| DeWanna Bonner (5)
| Staples Center1,695
| 23–6
|- style="background:#bbffbb;"
| 30
| September 11
| @ Phoenix
| W 76–67
| Jasmine Thomas (17)
| Jonquel Jones (16)
| Briann January (5)
| Footprint Center9,811
| 24–6
|- style="background:#bbffbb;"
| 31
| September 15
| New York
| W 98–69
| BonnerJ. Jones (18)
| Jonquel Jones (13)
| Natisha Hiedeman (5)
| Mohegan Sun Arena4,012
| 25–6
|- style="background:#bbffbb;"
| 32
| September 19
| Atlanta
| W 84–64
| Natisha Hiedeman (16)
| Brionna Jones (12)
| Briann January (4)
| Mohegan Sun Arena4,724
| 26–6

Playoffs 

|- style="background:#fcc;"
| 1
| September 28
| Chicago
| L 95–101 (2OT)
| Jonquel Jones (26)
| Jonquel Jones (11)
| JanuaryJ. Jones (4)
| Mohegan Sun Arena4,720
| 0–1
|- style="background:#cfc;"
| 2
| September 30
| Chicago
| W 79–68
| BonnerA. Thomas (15)
| Alyssa Thomas (11)
| Alyssa Thomas (6)
| Mohegan Sun Arena6,088
| 1–1
|- style="background:#fcc;"
| 3
| October 3
| @ Chicago
| L 83–86
| DeWanna Bonner (22)
| Jonquel Jones (10)
| Jasmine Thomas (6)
| Wintrust Arena7,421
| 1–2
|- style="background:#fcc;"
| 4
| October 6
| @ Chicago
| L 69–79
| Jonquel Jones (25)
| Jonquel Jones (11)
| Alyssa Thomas (4)
| Wintrust Arena
|

Standings

Playoffs

Statistics

Source:

Regular Season

Awards and honors

References

External links

Connecticut Sun at ESPN.com

Connecticut Sun seasons
Events in Uncasville, Connecticut
Connecticut
Connecticut Sun